Migmella is a genus of tephritid  or fruit flies in the family Tephritidae.

Species
Migmella amplifrons (Bezzi, 1920)
Migmella elgonensis Munro, 1957
Migmella planifrons (Loew, 1861)
Migmella scotia Munro, 1957

References

Tephritinae
Tephritidae genera
Diptera of Africa